September 26 - Eastern Orthodox liturgical calendar - September 28

All fixed commemorations below celebrated on October 10 by Orthodox Churches on the Old Calendar.{{#tag:ref|The notation Old Style or (OS) is sometimes used to indicate a date in the Julian Calendar (which is used by churches on the "Old Calendar").The notation New Style or (NS), indicates a date in the Revised Julian calendar(which is used by churches on the "New Calendar").|group=note}}

For September 27th, Orthodox Churches on the Old Calendar commemorate the Saints listed on September 14.

Saints
 Apostles Mark of Bibloupolis, Aristarchus, and Zenas the Lawyer, of the Seventy (1st century)Great Synaxaristes:  Οἱ Ἅγιοι Μᾶρκος, Ἀρίσταρχος καὶ Ζήνων οἱ Ἀπόστολοι. 27 Σεπτεμβρίου. ΜΕΓΑΣ ΣΥΝΑΞΑΡΙΣΤΗΣ.
 Martyr Epicharis of Rome (c. 298)Martyr Epicharis of Rome. OCA - Lives of the Saints.
 Martyr Gaiana.Great Synaxaristes:  Ἡ Ἁγία Γαϊανὴ. 27 Σεπτεμβρίου. ΜΕΓΑΣ ΣΥΝΑΞΑΡΙΣΤΗΣ.
 Hieromarytr Philemon the Bishop, and martyr Fortunatus.
 Holy 15 martyrs drowned at sea.Great Synaxaristes:  Οἱ Ἅγιοι 15 Μάρτυρες. 27 Σεπτεμβρίου. ΜΕΓΑΣ ΣΥΝΑΞΑΡΙΣΤΗΣ.
 Martyrs Callistratus of Carthage and 49 martyrs with him (304)
 Saint Flavian I of Antioch, Archbishop of Antioch (404)October 10 / September 27. HOLY TRINITY RUSSIAN ORTHODOX CHURCH (A parish of the Patriarchate of Moscow).  (see also: February 16)
 Venerable Ignatius, Abbot of the Monastery of the Deep Stream in Asia Minor (963-975)Venerable Ignatius the Abbot in Asia Minor. OCA - Lives of the Saints.

Pre-Schism Western saints
 Saint Caius of Milan (Gaius), by tradition the first Bishop of Milan in Italy (1st century)
 Saint Adheritus (Abderitus, Adhentus, Adery),  a Greek by birth, he succeeded St Apollinaris as Bishop of Ravenna in Italy (2nd century)
 Saint Deodatus, a martyr in Sora in central Italy.
 Saints Fidentius and Terence, martyrs venerated in Todi in central Italy.
 Saints Florentinus and Hilary, two hermits martyred in France by barbarians.
 Saint Ceraunus (Ceran), Bishop of Paris in France (c. 614)
 Martyr Sigeberht of East Anglia, King of the East Angles (635)
 Saint Barrog (Barrwg, Barnoch, Barry), a disciple of St Cadoc of Wales, hermit (7th century)
 Saint Hiltrude, a hermit near the monastery of Liessies in France (c. 790)
 Saints Adolphus and John, two brothers born in Seville in Spain of a Moorish father and a Christian mother, martyred in Cordoba under Abderrahman II (c. 850)
 Saint Marcellus, born in Ireland, he became a monk at St Gall in Switzerland (c. 869)

Post-Schism Orthodox saints
 Venerable Sabbatius, Wonderworker of Solovki (1435)Venerable Sabbatius the Wonderworker of Solovki. OCA - Lives of the Saints.
 New Hieromartyr Anthimus the Georgian, Metropolitan of Wallachia(1716)
 New Virgin-martyr Aquilina of Zagliveri, Thessalonica (1764)New Martyr Aquilina. OCA - Lives of the Saints.
 Saint Archippus, Schemamonk of Glinsk Hermitage (1896)
 Saint Rachel, Schemanun of Borodino Convent (1928)

New martyrs and confessors
 New Hieromartyr Demetrius Shishokin, Priest (1918)
 New Hieromartyr Herman (Kosolapov), Bishop of Volsk (1919)
 New Hieromartyr Michael Platonov, Priest (1919)
 New Hieromartyr Peter (Polyansky), Metropolitan of Krutitsy (1937)
 New Hieromartyr Theodore Bogoyavlensky, Priest (1937)

Other commemorations
 Commemoration of the vision and speechlessness of Zachariah.

Icon gallery

Notes

References

Sources
 September 27/October 10. Orthodox Calendar (PRAVOSLAVIE.RU).
 October 10 / September 27. HOLY TRINITY RUSSIAN ORTHODOX CHURCH (A parish of the Patriarchate of Moscow).
 September 27. OCA - The Lives of the Saints.
 The Autonomous Orthodox Metropolia of Western Europe and the Americas (ROCOR). St. Hilarion Calendar of Saints for the year of our Lord 2004. St. Hilarion Press (Austin, TX). p. 72.
 The Twenty-Seventh Day of the Month of September. Orthodoxy in China.
 September 27. Latin Saints of the Orthodox Patriarchate of Rome.
 The Roman Martyrology. Transl. by the Archbishop of Baltimore. Last Edition, According to the Copy Printed at Rome in 1914. Revised Edition, with the Imprimatur of His Eminence Cardinal Gibbons. Baltimore: John Murphy Company, 1916. pp. 298–299.
 Rev. Richard Stanton. A Menology of England and Wales, or, Brief Memorials of the Ancient British and English Saints Arranged According to the Calendar, Together with the Martyrs of the 16th and 17th Centuries. London: Burns & Oates, 1892. p. 460.

 Greek Sources
 Great Synaxaristes:  27 ΣΕΠΤΕΜΒΡΙΟΥ. ΜΕΓΑΣ ΣΥΝΑΞΑΡΙΣΤΗΣ.
  Συναξαριστής. 27 Σεπτεμβρίου. ECCLESIA.GR. (H ΕΚΚΛΗΣΙΑ ΤΗΣ ΕΛΛΑΔΟΣ).
  27/09/2016.'' Ορθόδοξος Συναξαριστής.

 Russian Sources
  10 октября (27 сентября). Православная Энциклопедия под редакцией Патриарха Московского и всея Руси Кирилла (электронная версия). (Orthodox Encyclopedia - Pravenc.ru).
  27 сентября по старому стилю  /  10 октября по новому стилю. Русская Православная Церковь - Православный церковный календарь на 2016 год.

September in the Eastern Orthodox calendar